This article provides details on candidates who stood at the 2007 Australian federal election.

Nominations were formally declared open by the Australian Electoral Commission following the issue of the writ on Wednesday, 17 October 2007. Nominations closed at 12 noon Thursday, 1 November 2007. The received nominations were declared public after 12 noon Friday 2 November 2007.

The election itself was held on Saturday 24 November 2007.

Redistributions and seat changes
Redistributions of electoral boundaries occurred in New South Wales and Queensland.
In New South Wales, the National-held seat of Gwydir was abolished. The Independent-held seat of Calare became notionally National, the Liberal-held seat of Macquarie became notionally Labor, and the Labor-held seat of Parramatta became notionally Liberal.
The member for Parkes, John Cobb (National), contested Calare.
In Queensland, the notionally National seat of Flynn was created.

Retiring Members and Senators
The following Members of the House of Representatives (denoted "MP") and Senators did not seek another term at the election.

Labor
 Kim Beazley MP (Brand, WA): announced retirement after losing the Labor Party leadership in December 2006.
 Ann Corcoran MP (Isaacs, Vic): lost preselection in March 2006.
 Graham Edwards MP (Cowan, WA): announced retirement in January 2006.
 Michael Hatton MP (Blaxland, NSW): lost preselection in May 2007.
 Kelly Hoare MP (Charlton, NSW): lost preselection in May 2007.
 Carmen Lawrence MP (Fremantle, WA): announced retirement March 2007.
 Rod Sawford MP (Port Adelaide, SA): announced retirement in August 2006.
 Bob Sercombe MP (Maribyrnong, Vic): announced retirement in February 2006, facing likely preselection defeat.
 Senator George Campbell (NSW): announced retirement in April 2007, facing likely preselection defeat.
 Senator Linda Kirk (SA): lost preselection in June 2007.
 Senator Robert Ray (Vic): did not renominate.

Liberal
 Bruce Baird MP (Cook, NSW): announced retirement in April 2007.
 Alan Cadman MP (Mitchell, NSW): withdrew candidacy in June 2007, facing likely preselection defeat.
 Trish Draper MP (Makin, SA): announced retirement in July 2006.
 Kay Elson MP (Forde, Qld): announced retirement in October 2006.
 Warren Entsch MP (Leichhardt, Qld): announced retirement in January 2006.
 David Jull MP (Fadden, Qld): announced retirement in January 2007.
 Jackie Kelly MP (Lindsay, NSW): announced retirement in May 2007.
 Geoff Prosser MP (Forrest, WA): announced retirement in June 2006.
 Barry Wakelin MP (Grey, SA): announced retirement in August 2006.
 Senator Rod Kemp (Vic): announced retirement in May 2006.
 Senator Ross Lightfoot (WA): announced retirement in April 2007, facing likely preselection defeat.
 Senator Kay Patterson (Vic): announced retirement in January 2006.
 Senator John Watson (Tas): lost preselection in May 2007.

National
 John Anderson MP (Gwydir, NSW): announced retirement after stepping down as National Party leader and Deputy Prime Minister in June 2005.
 Ian Causley MP (Page, NSW): announced retirement in October 2006.
 Senator Sandy Macdonald (NSW): announced retirement in October 2006 after losing preselection for second spot on the Coalition Senate ticket.

Democrats
 Senator Andrew Murray (WA): announced retirement in July 2006.
 Senator Natasha Stott Despoja (SA): announced retirement in October 2006.

Independent
 Peter Andren MP (Calare, NSW): In March 2007, Andren declared his intention to retire from his House of Representatives seat and run for a NSW Senate seat. Subsequently, Andren was diagnosed with cancer and in August 2007 he announced his retirement from politics altogether. Andren died on 3 November 2007.
 Harry Quick MP (Franklin, Tas): announced retirement in August 2005 (he was expelled from the ALP in August 2007 and sat for the remainder of his term as an Independent).

House of Representatives
Sitting members are shown in bold text. Successful candidates are highlighted in the relevant colour. Where there is possible confusion, an asterisk (*) is also used.

Australian Capital Territory

New South Wales

 Note: Notional party status of Calare, Macquarie and Parramatta altered by redistribution

Northern Territory

Queensland

South Australia

Tasmania

Victoria

Western Australia

Senate
Sitting senators are shown in bold text. Tickets that elected at least one Senator are highlighted in the relevant colour. Successful candidates are identified by an asterisk (*).

Australian Capital Territory
Two Senate places were up for election. The Labor Party was defending one seat. The Liberal Party was defending one seat.

New South Wales
Six Senate places were up for election. The Labor Party was defending two seats. The Liberal-National Coalition was defending three seats. The Australian Greens were defending one seat. Senators John Faulkner (Labor), Concetta Fierravanti-Wells (Liberal), Michael Forshaw (Labor), Bill Heffernan (Liberal), Steve Hutchins (Labor) and Fiona Nash (National) were not up for re-election.

Northern Territory
Two Senate places were up for election. The Labor Party was defending one seat. The Country Liberal Party was defending one seat.

Queensland
Six Senate places were up for election. The Labor Party was defending two seats. The Liberal-National Coalition was defending three seats. The Australian Democrats were defending one seat. Senators George Brandis (Liberal), Barnaby Joyce (National), Joe Ludwig (Labor), Brett Mason (Liberal), Jan McLucas (Labor) and Russell Trood (Liberal) were not up for re-election.

South Australia
Six Senate places were up for election. The Labor Party was defending two seats. The Liberal Party was defending three seats. The Australian Democrats were defending one seat. Senators Alan Ferguson (Liberal), Mary Jo Fisher (Liberal), Annette Hurley (Labor), Anne McEwen (Labor), Nick Minchin (Liberal) and Dana Wortley (Labor) were not up for re-election.

Tasmania
Six Senate places were up for election. The Labor Party was defending two seats. The Liberal Party was defending three seats. The Australian Greens were defending one seat. Senators Eric Abetz (Liberal), Guy Barnett (Liberal), Christine Milne (Greens), Kerry O'Brien (Labor), Stephen Parry (Liberal) and Helen Polley (Labor) were not up for re-election.

Victoria
Six Senate places were up for election. The Labor Party was defending two seats. The Liberal-National Coalition was defending three seats. The Australian Democrats were defending one seat. Senators Kim Carr (Labor), Stephen Conroy (Labor), Steve Fielding (Family First), Julian McGauran (Liberal), Michael Ronaldson (Liberal) and Judith Troeth (Liberal) were not up for re-election.

Western Australia
Six Senate places were up for election. The Labor Party was defending two seats. The Liberal Party was defending three seats. The Australian Democrats were defending one seat. Senators Judith Adams (Liberal), Mathias Cormann (Liberal), Chris Ellison (Liberal), Chris Evans (Labor), Rachel Siewert (Greens) and Glenn Sterle (Labor) were not up for re-election.

Summary by party 
Below is a comprehensive list of registered parties contesting the elections for the House of Representatives and the Senate. Beside each party is the number of seats contested by that party in the House of Representatives for each state, as well as an indication of whether the party contested the Senate election in the respective state.

¹Includes 5 New South Wales seats contested as "Country Labor" 
²Contested as "One Nation WA" in Queensland and Western Australia 
³Shooters Party and AFLP contested a joint ticket in New South Wales

Unregistered parties and groups
Some parties and groups that did not qualify for registration with the Australian Electoral Commission nevertheless endorsed candidates, who appeared on the ballot papers as independent or unaffiliated candidates.

The Secular Party of Australia ran Senate tickets in all states: Group J in New South Wales, Group P in Victoria, Group W in Queensland, Group Q in Western Australia, Group B in South Australia and Group H in Tasmania.
The Socialist Party endorsed Kylie McGregor in Melbourne.
The Communist League endorsed Alasdair Macdonald in Parramatta and Ronald Poulsen in Watson.
"Abolish State Governments" endorsed Group P for the Senate in New South Wales.
FreeMatilda endorsed Group K for the Senate in Queensland.

Former candidates
The following preselected candidates either voluntarily withdrew their candidacy or were disendorsed by a party.

Labor
 Jennifer Algie: original preselected candidate for the newly created seat of Flynn (Qld). Algie withdrew in February 2007.
 John Fitzroy: original preselected candidate for National held Cowper (NSW). Labor re-opened nominations for the seat in September 2007 to choose a superior candidate, after polling showed the seat more winnable than previously thought.
 Shane Guley: original preselected candidate for National held Maranoa (Qld). Guley withdrew in October 2007 after allegations of assault and intimidation became public.
 Kevin Harkins: original preselected candidate for Labor held Franklin (Tas). Harkins withdrew in August 2007, facing charges of illegal strike action.
 Greg Pargeter: original preselected candidate for Liberal held La Trobe (Vic). Pargeter was dropped to make way for another candidate in August 2007.
 Steve Reissig: original preselected candidate for Liberal held Bass (Tas). Reissig withdrew in October 2006.
 Bruce Simmonds: original preselected candidate for Liberal held McPherson (Qld). Simmonds withdrew in February 2007 after his company was accused of "acting dishonestly".

Liberal
 Ken Aldred: original preselected candidate for Labor held Holt (Vic). Aldred, a former federal Liberal MP from 1975 to 1980 and 1983 to 1996, won the branch-level ballot to be the party's nominee. However, Aldred's preselection proved to be controversial due to his history of using parliamentary privilege to air spurious allegations against prominent community figures. His preselection was not ratified by Administrative Committee of the Liberal Party in Victoria.
 Mathew Brown: original preselected candidate for Liberal held Tangney (WA). Brown defeated sitting Liberal MP Dennis Jensen in a branch-level vote. But in October 2006, the party's state council overturned this result and endorsed Jensen instead. Brown was subsequently preselected for the unwinnable sixth spot on the party's Senate (WA) ticket.
 Steve Coltman: original preselected candidate for Labor held Ballarat (Vic). Coltman withdrew in February 2007.
 Hamish Jones: original preselected candidate for Labor held Maribyrnong (Vic). Jones was deselected in August 2007 following revelations he'd used his blog site to air derogatory personal attacks against several politicians.
 Paul McLoughlin: original preselected candidate for Labor held Calwell (Vic). McLoughlin stood down in October 2007.
 Cam Nation: original preselected candidate for Labor held Gorton (Vic). Nation was replaced as a candidate in September 2007.
 Ben Quin: preselected candidate for Labor held Lyons (Tas). Quin tendered his resignation from the Liberal party because of his opposition to the controversial Tamar Valley pulp mill project in northern Tasmania. Instead, Quin ran as an independent candidate.
 Philippa Reid: original preselected candidate for Liberal held Forrest (WA). Reid withdrew in November 2006 following revelations that she was called before an anti-corruption inquiry.
 Michael Towke: original preselected candidate for Liberal held Cook (NSW). Towke's candidacy was overturned by the NSW Liberal Party state execute following allegations of branch stacking.

Family First
 Renee Sciberras: preselected candidate for the Labor held Prospect (NSW). She was deselected as the candidate after revealing photographs posted on her Facebook page were leaked to the media.
 Andrew Quah: original preselected candidate for the Labor held Prospect (NSW), then for the Labor held Parramatta (NSW). Quah was expelled from the party after nude photos of himself appeared on gay websites around Australia. Quah claimed the photos were composites digitally altered in Photoshop.

References

 2007 Federal Election - candidates details

See also
 2007 Australian federal election
 Members of the Australian House of Representatives, 2004–2007
 Members of the Australian Senate, 2005–2008
 List of political parties in Australia

2007 elections in Australia
Candidates for Australian federal elections